Roseworth is an area of Norton in the Borough of Stockton-on-Tees, County Durham, England. 

It borders Hardwick to the south west, Ragworth to the south east (in the same ward) and Norton centre to the east.

The Roseworth housing estate was built in the 1960s, and every street name on the estate begins with "R".

Gallery

References

Areas of Stockton-on-Tees
Housing estates in England